The Color Purple is a 1985 American epic coming-of-age period drama film directed by Steven Spielberg and written by Menno Meyjes, based on the Pulitzer Prize-winning 1982 novel of the same name by Alice Walker. It was Spielberg's eighth film as a director, and marked a turning point in his career, as it was a departure from the summer blockbusters for which he had become known. It was also the first feature film directed by Spielberg for which John Williams did not compose the music, instead featuring a score by Quincy Jones, who also produced. The cast stars Whoopi Goldberg in her breakthrough role, with Danny Glover, Oprah Winfrey in her film debut, Margaret Avery, Rae Dawn Chong, Willard Pugh, and Adolph Caesar.

Filmed in Anson and Union counties in North Carolina, the film tells the story of a young African-American girl named Celie Harris and shows the problems African-American women experienced during the early 20th century, including domestic violence, incest, pedophilia, poverty, racism, and sexism.

The film was a box office success, grossing $142 million against a budget of $15 million. The film received acclaim from critics, with particular praise going to its acting (especially Goldberg's performance), direction, screenplay, musical score, and production values. However, it was also criticized by some for being "over-sentimental" and "stereotypical", and was boycotted by some chapters of the NAACP for its depiction of rape. Nonetheless, the film was nominated for eleven Academy Awards, including Best Picture, Best Actress for Goldberg, Best Supporting Actress for both Avery and Winfrey, and Best Adapted Screenplay, but did not achieve a single win, and Spielberg did not receive a nomination for Best Director; it held the record for the film receiving the most nominations without a win at the Academy Awards since The Turning Point (1977) at this stage. It also received four Golden Globe Award nominations, with Goldberg winning Best Actress in a Drama. Spielberg received a Directors Guild of America Award for Outstanding Directorial Achievement, and a Golden Globe nomination. The film was later included in Roger Ebert's book series The Great Movies.

Plot

In early 20th-century rural Hartwell, Georgia, Celie Harris is a teenage African-American who has had two children born of rape by her abusive father, having removed them from their home before giving Celie away as a wife to Albert "Mister" Johnson.

Mister, a widower, initially wanted to marry Nettie, Celie's younger sister, to whom he is attracted. He also abuses Celie, and his children mistreat her. One day, Nettie runs away from home because she is tired of fighting off her father's sexual advances and seeks shelter with Celie, where the two promise to write if they are separated. When Mister attempts to sexually assault Nettie, she fights him off and he furiously kicks her out of the house, fulfilling the promise she and Celie made.

Years later, in 1916, Celie has grown meek from prolonged childhood abuse. Mister's son Harpo marries Sofia, and Celie is shocked to find her running a matriarchal household. Harpo attempts to overpower and strike Sofia, but he fails. Celie advises Harpo to beat Sofia. Sofia retaliates and confronts Celie, revealing her long history of abuse. She threatens to kill Harpo if he beats her again and tells Celie to do likewise to Mister. After Harpo fails to change following years of continuous abuse between them, Sofia leaves and takes their children.

Mister and Harpo bring home the ailing Shug Avery, a showgirl and Mister's long-time mistress. Celie, who has slowly developed a fondness for Shug through a photograph sent to Mister, is in awe of Shug's strong will. She nurses Shug back to health, and Shug, in turn, takes a liking to her, writing and performing a song about her at Harpo's newly opened jook joint that he operates with his girlfriend, Squeak. Shug tells Celie she is moving to Memphis, and Celie confides to Shug that Mister beats her. Shug tells Celie that she is beautiful and that she loves her, and they kiss. Celie packs her things to follow Shug to Memphis, but is caught by Mister.

Meanwhile, Sofia has been imprisoned for striking the town's mayor after he slaps her for cursing at his wife (who asked Sofia to be her maid to which she responded "Hell No"). Years pass, and now a shell of her former self, she is released from prisononly to be immediately ordered by the judge to become a maid to the mayor's wife, Ms. Millie. Having not seen her children in eight years, Sofia is allotted Christmas to be with her family by Ms. Millie after encountering Celie in town, but Ms. Millie recants her offer after panicking while trying to leave the yard (because she is scared of the "colored folk" who are only trying to help her) and not being able to get the car in gear.

Shug returns to Celie and Mister's home with her new husband Grady, in town on business. Grady and Mister become intoxicated while Shug checks the mailbox. She finds a letter from Celie's sister in Africa. Shug gives Celie the letter from Nettie, who tells her that she is working for a couple who adopted Celie's children. Celie and Shug realize that Mister has been hiding Nettie's letters from Celie. While he and Grady are out drinking, Shug and Celie search the house, finding a hidden compartment under the floorboards containing bundles of Nettie's unread letters.

Engrossed in reading, Celie does not hear Mister's calls to shave him, and he slaps her. Celie sets her mind to kill Mister with his straight razor, but Shug stops her. At a family gathering, Celie finally speaks up against Mister and his years of abuse, to the delight of Shug. This fighting spirit also brings back Sofia's old self, and prompts Squeak to insist on men using her real name, Mary Agnes. Celie responds to Mister's taunts with a curse on him. Shug and Grady drive away, taking Celie and Mary with them.

Years later, Shug reunites with her father, who is a pastor, after years of estrangement because of his disapproval of the life path she chose. Mister has become a lonely drunk and let his home and farm fall into ruin. Harpo has made amends with Sofia; they now run the bar together, and Shug still performs there when she comes to town. Upon Celie's father's passing, she finally learns from Nettie's letters that he wasn't their biological father after all. When their mother died, "his" property was legally inherited by Celie and Nettie, and the home and shop that had belonged to her biological father pass to Celie.

Celie begins to operate a tailor shop. Mister receives a letter from Nettie addressed to Celie, takes money from his secret stash, and arranges for Nettie, her husband, and Celie's children to return to the U.S. from Africa. While Mister watches from a distance, Celie, Nettie, and the children reunite, and the two sisters bond over a hand-clapping game from their childhood.

Cast

Production

Development 
Alice Walker was initially reluctant to sell the film rights to her novel, due to Hollywood's portrayal of female and African-American characters. She only agreed to executive producers Jon Peters and Peter Guber's offer after consulting with friends, who agreed the only way to improve representation of minorities was to work within the system. Walker's contract stipulated that she would serve as project consultant and that 50% of the production team, aside from the cast, would be African American, female, or "people of the Third World." Walker wrote an initial screenplay draft, but was replaced by Dutch-born writer Menno Meyjes, under the proviso that she be given final script approval. Walker worked as an uncredited script doctor, and coached actors in their use of a Southern African-American Vernacular English dialect.

Music mogul Quincy Jones, whose only prior film experience was as a composer, served as producer and approached Steven Spielberg to direct. Spielberg was initially reluctant to take the job, feeling his knowledge of the deep South was inadequate and that the film should be directed by someone of color. Walker was likewise skeptical, but was convinced otherwise after watching E.T. the Extra-Terrestrial. Spielberg waived his usual $15 million salary in lieu of the Directors Guild of America minimum of $40,000. He chose to play down the lesbian subtext between Celie and Shug, a decision he later regretted.

Casting 

Rather than cast established stars, Walker sought out lesser-known actors to play the principal roles, since their rise from obscurity represented the experience of characters in her novels. Whoopi Goldberg was a stand-up comedian whose only prior film role was in a 1982 avant-garde film, Citizen: I'm Not Losing My Mind, I'm Giving It Away. Oprah Winfrey was a radio and television host without prior acting experience, who was hired at Jones's insistence. After lobbying producers for the part, 29-year-old Goldberg was personally selected by Walker after she saw her stand-up. Goldberg's audition for Spielberg, where both Jones and Michael Jackson were present, saw her perform a routine involving a stoned E.T. being arrested for drug possession.

Other cast members, such as Danny Glover, Adolph Caesar, and Carl Anderson; were predominantly stage performers.  Akosua Busia was a graduate of the Royal Central School of Speech and Drama, and the daughter of Ghanaian prime minister Kofi Abrefa Busia. Goldberg's real-life daughter Alex Martin has a minor role as one of the children in the Easter sequence.

Margaret Avery was a veteran actress who'd previously won an NAACP Image Award for the made-for-television film Louis Armstrong – Chicago Style. Spielberg had pursued singers Chaka Khan and Tina Turner for the part of Shug, but both turned it down. Patti LaBelle and Sheryl Lee Ralph also auditioned, and Phyllis Hyman was considered. Though Avery had prior musical experience, her singing voice was dubbed by Táta Vega.

Filming 
While the novel was based on Walker's childhood home of Eatonton, Georgia, the film was shot predominantly in James C. Bennett's house, located in Lilesville (Anson County), and Union county in North Carolina during the summer months. Sets were constructed at an Antebellum-era plantation outside Wadesboro, while the town of Marshville had its paved roads covered in mud and clay to match the early 20th-century setting. The church was a real 60-year-old Baptist chapel that was moved piece-by-piece from its original location. Due to the summer heat, the winter sequences were shot with fabricated snow. Additional scenes were filmed on the Universal Studios Hollywood backlot, and a second unit led by Frank Marshall traveled to Kenya to shoot scenes in Nairobi and in the Maasai regions.

Spielberg encouraged both Goldberg and Winfrey to ad lib during filming, including Sofia's speech at the dinner table. Quincy Jones' insistence on giving more dialogue to Winfrey sparked an apparent feud between her and Goldberg that lasted several years afterwards.

Music 

The Color Purple's film score was written by Quincy Jones, the first feature film directed by Spielberg for which John Williams did not compose the music. The score combines elements of classical and period jazz, blues, and gospel, and features several popular songs of the era. The track Miss Celie's Blues (Sister), performed in the film by the character Shug (Avery; dubbed by Táta Vega), later gained popularity as a concert piece.

Due to his dual responsibilities as both producer and composer, Jones delegated many of the tasks to a team of eleven other musicians and arrangers. This led to a dispute during the Academy Awards over the nominees for Best Original Score. While Jones is the sole credited composer of the film, the nomination lists all twelve musicians (Jones, Chris Boardman, Jorge Calandrelli, Andraé Crouch, Jack Hayes, Jerry Hey, Randy Kerber, Jeremy Lubbock, Joel Rosenbaum, Caiphus Semenya, Fred Steiner and Rod Temperton).

Release
The Color Purple premiered on December 18, 1985, in Los Angeles. However, the premiere was picketed by members of the NAACP for its depiction of rape. The film went into general release in the United States on February 7, 1986. It was also shown at the 1986 Cannes Film Festival as a non-competing title.

Reception

Box office
The Color Purple was a success at the box office, staying in U.S. theaters for 21 weeks, and grossing over $142 million worldwide. In terms of box office income, it ranked as the number one rated PG-13 film released in 1985, and number four overall.

Critical response

The Color Purple received positive reviews from critics. On review aggregator Rotten Tomatoes, the film holds an approval rating of 77% based on 35 reviews, with an average score of 6.9/10. The website's critical consensus reads, "It might have been better served by a filmmaker with a deeper connection to the source material, but The Color Purple remains a worthy, well-acted adaptation of Alice Walker's classic novel." On Metacritic, the film received a score of 78 based on 7 reviews, indicating "generally favorable reviews".

Roger Ebert of the Chicago Sun-Times awarded the film four stars, calling it "the year's best film". He also praised Whoopi Goldberg, calling her role "one of the most amazing debut performances in movie history" and predicting she would win the Academy Award for Best Actress; she was nominated but did not win. Ebert wrote of The Color Purple:

Ebert's long-time television collaborator, Gene Siskel of the Chicago Tribune, praised the film as "triumphantly emotional and brave", calling it Spielberg's "successful attempt to enlarge his reputation as a director of youthful entertainments." Siskel wrote that The Color Purple was "a plea for respect for black women." Although acknowledging that the film was a period drama, he praised its "...incredibly strong stand against the way black men treat black women. Cruel is too kind a word to describe their behavior. The principal black men in The Color Purple use their womenboth wives and daughtersas sexual chattel."

The New York Times film critic Janet Maslin noted the film's divergence from Walker's book, but made the case that this shift works:

Variety found the film over-sentimental, writing, "there are some great scenes and great performances in The Color Purple, but it is not a great film. Steven Spielberg's turn at 'serious' film-making is marred in more than one place by overblown production that threatens to drown in its own emotions."

In addition, some critics alleged that the film stereotyped black people in general and black men in particular, pointing to the fact that Spielberg, who is white, had directed a predominantly African-American story. In response, Spielberg said, "Most of the criticism came from directors [who] felt that we had overlooked them, and that it should have been a black director telling a black story. That was the main criticism. The other criticism was that I had softened the book. I have always copped to that. I made the movie I wanted to make from Alice Walker's book. There were certain things in the [lesbian] relationship between Shug Avery and Celie that were finely detailed in Alice's book, that I didn't feel could get a [PG-13] rating. And I was shy about it. In that sense, perhaps I was the wrong director to acquit some of the more sexually honest encounters between Shug and Celie, because I did soften those. I basically took something that was extremely erotic and very intentional, and I reduced it to a simple kiss. I got a lot of criticism for that." Filmmaker Oliver Stone defended The Color Purple as "an excellent movie, and it was an attempt to deal with an issue that had been overlooked, and it wouldn't have been done if it hadn't been Spielberg. And it's not like everyone says, that he ruined the book. That's horseshit. Nobody was going to do the book. He made the book live again."

In 2004, Ebert included The Color Purple in his list of "Great Movies". He stated that "I can see its flaws more easily than when I named it the best film of 1985, but I can also understand why it moved me so deeply, and why the greatness of some films depends not on their perfection or logic, but on their heart."

Accolades
The Color Purple was nominated for 11 Academy Awards (including Best Picture, Best Actress for Goldberg and Best Supporting Actress for both Avery and Winfrey). It failed to win any of them, tying the record set by 1977's The Turning Point for the most Oscar nominations without a single win. Some organizations such as the NAACP protested the decision of the Academy of Motion Picture Arts and Sciences to not award the film any categories.

Steven Spielberg received his first Directors Guild of America Award at the 38th awards ceremony for Outstanding Directorial Achievement in Motion Pictures. He became the first director to win the award without even being nominated for the Academy Award for Best Director.

Musical film remake

On November 2, 2018, it was announced that a film adaptation of the 2005 stage musical version was in development. Steven Spielberg and Quincy Jones returned to co-produce this version, alongside the stage musical's producers Scott Sanders and Oprah Winfrey. On August 25, 2020, it was announced that Marcus Gardley will pen the screenplay and Black is King'''s Blitz Bazawule will direct. On December 23, 2020, it was announced that the film would be released on December 20, 2023, and that Alice Walker, Rebecca Walker, Kristie Macosko Krieger, Carla Gardini, and Mara Jacobs will executive produce the film. H.E.R. and Corey Hawkins were cast in August 2021.

See also
 List of American films of 1985
 The Color Purple (musical), the musical theatre version of the novel.

References

 Further reading 
 Tibbetts, John C., and James M. Welsh, eds. The Encyclopedia of Novels into Film'' (2nd ed. 2005) pp 67–68.

External links

 
 
 
 
 
 

1985 films
1980s English-language films
1985 drama films
1980s feminist films
1985 LGBT-related films
African-American drama films
American LGBT-related films
American feminist films
Films about gender
Films scored by Quincy Jones
Films about child abuse
Films about dysfunctional families
Films about race and ethnicity
Films about racism
Films about remarriage
Films based on American novels
Films directed by Steven Spielberg
Films featuring a Best Drama Actress Golden Globe-winning performance
Films produced by Kathleen Kennedy
Films produced by Frank Marshall
Films produced by Steven Spielberg
Films set in 1909
Films set in 1916
Films set in 1922
Films set in 1930
Films set in 1935
Films set in 1937
Films set in 1938
Films set in Georgia (U.S. state)
Films shot in North Carolina
Incest in film
Lesbian-related films
LGBT-related drama films
African-American LGBT-related films
Amblin Entertainment films
Films about rape
Warner Bros. films
Films produced by Quincy Jones
Films shot in Kenya
Films shot in Los Angeles County, California
Films about sisters
Alice Walker
1980s female buddy films
1980s American films
African-American-related controversies in film